František Čermák and Michal Mertiňák were the defending champions, but chose not to participate that year, competing in Dubai instead.

Łukasz Kubot and Oliver Marach won in the final 6–0, 6–0, against Fabio Fognini and Potito Starace.

Seeds

Draw

Draw

External links
Doubles Draw

Abierto Mexicano Telcel - Men's Doubles
2010 Abierto Mexicano Telcel